The Eastern Districts Football League is an Australian rules football leagues based in the eastern Wheatbelt region of Western Australia.  The league stretches from Southern Cross in the east, Hyden in the south, Corrigin in the west and Nukarni in the north.

History

The Eastern Districts Football League (EDFL) was formed in 1960 after a merger of the Merredin Football Association (MFA) and the Bruce Rock-Narembeen Football Association (BRNFA).  

Teams from the MFA included Baandee, Burracoppin, Muntagdin, Nukarni, Merredin Railways and Merredin Towns.  

Teams from the BRNFA included Bruce Rock, Narembeen Rovers, Narembeen Warriors and Shackleton.

In 1963, the two Narembeen clubs - Rovers and Warriors - merged to form a single Narembeen club.

In 1966, the league expanded with the inclusion of a new club from Southern Cross.

In 1971, Corrigin and Kondinin joined the league from the disbanded Corrigin Football Association.

In 1974, Merredin Towns and Baandee merged to form Merredin Lions.

In 1983, Hyden-Karlgarin and Kulin joined the league from the disbanded Lake Grace-Kulin Districts Football League

In 2005, Kulin and Kondinin merged to form Kulin-Kondinin Blues.

Current clubs

Former clubs

Grand final results

Ladders

2009 ladder

2010 ladder

2011 ladder

2012 ladder

2013 ladder

2014 ladder

2015 ladder

2016 ladder

2017 ladder

2018 ladder

2019 ladder

References

Australian rules football competitions in Western Australia